The Swedish Research Council  is a  Government agency in Sweden established in 2001, with the responsibility to support and develop basic scientific research. Its objective is for Sweden to be a leading nation in scientific research. The agency has three main functions: 

To distribute government funding for basic research 
To advise the government on issues related to scientific research
To communicate science and scientific research to the general public

See also
 Open access in Sweden

References

External links
Swedish Research Council - Official site

Research Council
Government research
Research and development in Sweden
Research councils
Research funding agencies